Kegham is an Armenian given name. Notable people with the name include:

 Kegham Kavafyan, Ottoman Armenian architect
 Kegham Parseghian, Armenian writer, teacher, editor, and journalist
 Kégham Atmadjian, French-Armenian poet and editor
 Kegham Vanigian, Armenian political activist and newspaper editor
 Msho Kegham, Armenian writer

Armenian given names